Coloraderpeton is an extinct genus of aïstopod tetrapodomorphs within the family Oestocephalidae. Coloraderpeton is known from the Carboniferous Sangre de Cristo Formation of Colorado, and was initially known from vertebrae, ribs, and scales recovered from a UCLA field expedition in 1966. Peter Paul Vaughn described these remains in 1969. A skull was later reported in an unpublished 1983 thesis and formally described by Jason S. Anderson in 2003.

References

Aistopods
Carboniferous amphibians
Carboniferous amphibians of North America
Fossil taxa described in 1969